Bansard International is a French company of third party logistics and freight forwarding. The company services Europe, North Africa, the Middle East, Asia and North America, offering multimodal transportation services via air, sea, road and railway.

History 
Founded by Jean-Pierre Bansard in 1963 as the Bansard International Transportation Group, the company began by offering road transportation services within Europe. This later expanded to shipments by air, sea and rail, with the company providing full transport industry–type logistical services. 

Bansard's clients are primarily in the business-to-business (B2B) and business-to-consumer (B2C) sectors, with the company's shipping services handling textiles, cosmetics, automotive parts, alcoholic beverages and other goods.

Company milestones
In 1965 Bansard opened its airfreight department with offices in Orly and later offices located within Charles de Gaulle airport in Paris. 
In 1977 the company opened a custom brokerage department along with its first bonded warehouse in Orly, France.
After joining the company in 2000, Simon Pinto became main shareholder and CEO in 2003. The company opened subsidiaries in Belgium and China. Its Shanghai office was made Asia-Pacific regional headquarters.
In 2007 Bansard entered into agreement with Allport UK, a freight forwarding company, opening 39% of Bansard's capital. Bansard opened several offices in France: Poitiers, Limoges and Strasbourg.
In 2013 Bansard expanded in China and opened new subsidiaries in Spain and India. In North Africa, new offices were inaugurated in Tunisia and Morocco. 
In 2013 the US Federal Maritime Commission (FMC) solicited comments on its plan to pool resources in shipping known as the P3 Vessel Sharing Agreement, a plan described as "unprecedented in its scale and scope." Bansard, along with many of its shipping industry colleagues, indicated their support for FMC's entry into the P3 Agreement. 
Also in 2013, Bansard implemented plans to handle cargo which fails to fill an entire shipment container, known in the industry as LCL (Less than Container Load), on select shipments to North African countries from five areas of departure in Europe.
In 2014 Bansard acquired CrossLog, a software company specializing in E-commerce logistics such as warehouse management systems and transport management systems. The company was renamed Crosslog International. 
In 2014 Bansard opened offices in Bangladesh and Thailand.
In 2015 Bansard opened subsidiaries in Vietnam and Israel, and launched offices and warehouses in Nanjing, China.
In 2016 Bansard opened subsidiaries in Cambodia and Singapore.
Also in 2016, Bansard entered into a joint-venture in the United States with Anker International.
In 2019, Bansard acquired a stake in the Australian company Cargo Line International.

Locations
Bansard manages its logistics and shipping operations from offices located in the following cities:

Rungis serves as Bansard's European regional headquarters while Shanghai serves as its Asia-Pacific regional headquarters.

References

External links

Transport companies established in 1963
Transport companies of France
French companies established in 1963
Customs brokers